John Knight Mudie (10 April 1930 – 2 March 1992) was a Scottish international footballer who played as a forward. He won seventeen caps for his country, helping the Scotland national team to qualify for the 1958 FIFA World Cup.

Starting his career with Blackpool in 1947, he went on to spend the next fourteen years with the club, helping them to the FA Cup Final in 1951 and 1953, the latter of which ended in victory for the Tangerines. In all he scored 144 league goals for the club. He then spent 1961 to 1963 at Stoke City, helping them to the Second Division title in 1962–63, also spending a brief time on loan with Canadian club Toronto City. After signing with Port Vale in 1963, he spent 1965 to 1967 as the club's joint-manager, along with his long-time friend and teammate Stanley Matthews. He became a coach after he finished his career with Oswestry Town in 1967, though he later managed Northwich Victoria in 1973 and then American side Cleveland Cobras for a spell in 1978.

Biography

Early years
Born in Dundee, Jackie Mudie started his footballing career with local junior sides Lochee Harp and Stobswell Juniors.

Blackpool
Mudie joined Blackpool in September 1946, signing professional terms in May 1947. He was at the club throughout the 1950s, which are the most successful decade in the club's history.

After three years developing in the reserves, he made his debut on 8 March 1950, against Liverpool, scoring the only goal in a 1–0 win at Anfield. The following season he featured regularly as Blackpool challenged in the league and reached the 1951 FA Cup Final. Newcastle United proved too strong at Wembley, however, and two goals from Jackie Milburn took the trophy to the North-East. After the loss, Blackpool signed Ernie Taylor, and Mudie lost his place. Eventually, though, he worked his way back into the team.

In 1952–53, Blackpool bounced back from their disappointment in 1951's FA Cup Final when Mudie's last-minute goal against Tottenham Hotspur in that season's semi-final sealed a return to Wembley, this time to face Bolton Wanderers. This match is widely remembered as the "Matthews Final", due to the winger helping to turn a 3–1 deficit into a 4–3 win for Blackpool. Although Matthews and hat-trick scorer Stan Mortensen understandably took the limelight, Matthews himself would later acknowledge the importance of the selfless Mudie, noting that his "skill and work for others often made some of us look better than we really were".

In his early career, Mudie was considered an inside forward, however, when Mortensen was transferred to Hull City in August 1955, Mudie became Blackpool's regular centre-forward, despite his diminutive stature. This change of position, combined his scoring 22 and 38 goals in consecutive seasons, enabled him to achieve international recognition and he made his international debut against Wales in 1956. His hat-trick in a 4–2 win against Spain in 1957 helped Scotland qualify for the following year's World Cup and he was subsequently selected in the squad that travelled to Sweden. Scotland exited after the group stage, effectively ending Mudie's international career with 17 caps and nine goals to his name.

Stoke City
Stoke City signed Mudie, in March 1961 for £8,500, and he scored just five minutes into his debut against Scunthorpe United. He ended the 1960–61 season with three goals from 13 matches as Stoke flirted precariously with relegation. In the summer of 1961 Mudie spent the summer months playing for Canadian side Toronto City along with Stanley Matthews, Danny Blanchflower and Johnny Haynes. After a poor start to the 1961–62 campaign, Stoke's attendances at the Victoria Ground dropped alarmingly below the 10,000 mark. To address the situation manager Tony Waddington brought back Stanley Matthews to the club and it had the desired effect with 35,974 attending the next match against Huddersfield Town. Matthews's return also rekindled his partnership with Mudie which proved vital to winning the Second Division title in 1962–63 as Mudie scored 20 goals, including the opening goal in title decider against Luton Town.

Port Vale
Mudie moved to Stoke's local rivals Port Vale in November 1963 along with Ron Wilson in a "package" deal of between £12,000 and £15,000.

Initially a regular, the ageing Mudie could not play on hard surfaces due to the risk of muscle jarring, he then lost his first team place on any surface in August 1964. After Freddie Steele's departure, Mudie became player-manager in February 1965, combining for a third time with boyhood Vale supporter Matthews, who became the Valiants' general-manager a few months later after playing his final First Division match for Stoke against Fulham five days after his 50th birthday. "We can fight our way out of this crisis," Mudie said at the time. "We must do. Although we are down at the bottom of the table, we are not out." His strategy was to spend money to bring in players from the North East, though this would ultimately prove to be an unsuccessful strategy. He resigned in May 1967, citing 'personal reasons'.

Later years
After his playing retirement, Mudie continued to live in Stoke-on-Trent, his adopted hometown, setting up a painting and decorating business. He had brief spells coaching at Oswestry Town, Crewe Alexandra (where he was assistant manager), Northwich Victoria, Leek Town and Eastwood Town and also spent one summer in America, as coach of the Cleveland Cobras in 1978. He also spent time in South Africa, as a scout for Johannesburg Rangers. 

Mudie died in Stoke in 1992, aged 61, two years after being diagnosed with cancer. Under Valiant 2001, his son, Graham, continued the Port Vale connection by working as a director of the club.

Style of play

Career statistics

Club statistics
Source:

International statistics

International goals
Scores and results list Scotland's goal tally first.

Managerial statistics

Honours
Blackpool
FA Cup: 1952–53; runner-up: 1950–51
Lancashire Senior Cup: 1953–54

Stoke City
Football League Second Division: 1962–63

See also
 List of Scotland national football team hat-tricks

References

Bibliography

External links 
 
 
 
 International stats at Londonhearts.com

Footballers from Dundee
Footballers from Stoke-on-Trent
Scottish footballers
Scotland international footballers
Association football forwards
Lochee Harp F.C. players
Blackpool F.C. players
Stoke City F.C. players
Toronto City players
Port Vale F.C. players
1958 FIFA World Cup players
Scottish Junior Football Association players
English Football League players
Eastern Canada Professional Soccer League players
Scottish expatriate sportspeople in the United States
Association football player-managers
Expatriate soccer managers in the United States
Scottish football managers
Scottish expatriate football managers
Port Vale F.C. managers
Oswestry Town F.C. managers
Northwich Victoria F.C. managers
English Football League managers
American Soccer League (1933–1983) coaches
Association football coaches
Association football scouts
Crewe Alexandra F.C. non-playing staff
1930 births
1992 deaths
FA Cup Final players